The  Cocodrilos de Tabasco Fútbol Club, commonly known as Cocodrilos, was a Mexican football club based in Villahermosa. The club was founded in 2017, and played in the Serie A of Liga Premier.

History
On June 22, 2017, Francisco Negrete Arceo announced the foundation of Isleños del Carmen and, at the same time, the call for the views that would begin the following day.

On September 13, 2017, the board announced the transfer of the equipment to Villahermosa, Tabasco, after having problems with the original headquarters in Ciudad del Carmen.

In July 2018 the team was promoted to Serie A as part of a franchise expansion, so it achieved its promotion automatically.
 On the other hand, in August of the same year, it was announced that the team will have a subsidiary team in Third Division from season 2018-19.

Players

Current squad

References 

Villahermosa
Football clubs in Tabasco
Association football clubs established in 2017
2017 establishments in Mexico
Liga Premier de México